Growth arrest and DNA-damage-inducible protein GADD45 alpha is a protein that in humans is encoded by the GADD45A gene.

Function 
This gene is a member of a group of genes, the GADD45 genes, whose transcript levels are increased following stressful growth arrest conditions and treatment with DNA-damaging agents (mutagens). The DNA damage-induced transcription of this gene is mediated by both p53-dependent and -independent mechanisms. The protein encoded by this gene responds to environmental stresses by mediating activation of the p38/JNK pathway via MTK1/MEKK4 kinase.

Applications 

The fact that expression of this gene is an indicator of DNA damage has been exploited to construct an in vitro test for mutagenicity, the GADD45a-GFP GreenScreen HC assay. This assay consists of a cell line which has been engineered so that expression of GADD45A will lead to expression of green fluorescent protein, which can easily be detected. To test a substance for mutagenicity, it is applied to these cells and fluorescence is measured.

Interactions 

GADD45A has been shown to interact with:
 AURKA,
 Cdk1, 
 CCNB1, 
 GADD45GIP1 
 MAP3K4, 
 P21, and
 PCNA.

See also
Gadd45

References

Further reading

External links